William Macaulay may refer to:
 William E. Macaulay, American billionaire businessman
 William Herrick Macaulay, British mathematician
 William MacAulay, Australian politician

See also
 William McCauley (disambiguation)